Hartland Township is one of the nineteen townships of Huron County, Ohio, United States. As of the 2010 census the population of the township was 1,112, up from 979 at the 2000 census.

Geography
Located in the eastern part of the county, it borders the following townships:
Townsend Township - north
Wakeman Township - northeast corner
Clarksfield Township - east
New London Township - southeast corner
Fitchville Township - south
Fairfield Township - southwest corner
Bronson Township - west
Norwalk Township - northwest corner

No municipalities are located in Hartland Township.

Name and history
Hartland Township was organized in 1826.

It is the only Hartland Township statewide.

Government
The township is governed by a three-member board of trustees, who are elected in November of odd-numbered years to a four-year term beginning on the following January 1. Two are elected in the year after the presidential election and one is elected in the year before it. There is also an elected township fiscal officer, who serves a four-year term beginning on April 1 of the year after the election, which is held in November of the year before the presidential election. Vacancies in the fiscal officership or on the board of trustees are filled by the remaining trustees.

References

External links
County website

Townships in Huron County, Ohio
Townships in Ohio